Ashfaq Ahmed (born June 6, 1973 in Lahore, Punjab) is a former Pakistani cricketer who played in one Test and 3 One Day Internationals (ODIs) in 1993. In his three ODI matches, he scored no runs, and took no wickets or catches.

References

1973 births
Living people
Pakistan One Day International cricketers
Pakistan Test cricketers
Pakistani cricketers
Pakistan International Airlines cricketers
Pakistan Automobiles Corporation cricketers
Lahore City cricketers
Cricketers from Lahore